
Gmina Cyców is a rural gmina (administrative district) in Łęczna County, Lublin Voivodeship, in eastern Poland.

Villages
Gmina Cyców contains the villages and settlements of Adamów, Barki, Bekiesza, Biesiadki, Cyców, Cyców-Kolonia Druga, Cyców-Kolonia Pierwsza, Garbatówka, Garbatówka-Kolonia, Głębokie, Janowica, Kopina, Ludwinów, Malinówka, Małków, Nowy Stręczyn, Ostrówek Podyski, Podgłębokie, Sewerynów, Stary Stręczyn, Stawek, Stawek-Kolonia, Stefanów, Świerszczów, Świerszczów-Kolonia, Szczupak, Wólka Cycowska, Wólka Nadrybska, Zagórze, Zaróbka and Zosin.

Neighbouring gminas
Gmina Cyców is bordered by the gminas of Ludwin, Puchaczów, Siedliszcze, Urszulin and Wierzbica.

References

Polish official population figures 2006

Cycow
Łęczna County